Begum Para (née  Zubeda Ul Haq; 25 December 1926 – 9 December 2008) was an Indian Hindi film actress who was active mostly in the 1940s and 1950s.  After almost 50 years of absence in the industry, she returned to films with her last role in Sanjay Leela Bhansali's Saawariya (2007) as Sonam Kapoor's grandmother. In her times in 1950s, she was considered a glamour girl of Bollywood, so much so, that Life magazine had a special session with her devoted to her fine sensuous photographs.

Early life
Begum Para was born as Zubeda Ul Haq in Jhelum in British India (present day in Pakistan). Her family was from Aligarh. Her father, Mian Ehsanul-Haq, was a judge who at some point in his life went into the judicial service of the princely state of Bikaner, now northern Rajasthan, where he became chief justice of its highest court. He was a fine cricketer of his time. She was brought up very disciplined yet liberal. She spent her childhood in Bikaner. She was educated at the Aligarh Muslim University. Her elder brother Masrurul Haq, had gone off to Bombay in the late 1930s to become an actor. There he had met and fell in love with the Bengali actress Protima Dasgupta, and married her.

Whenever she visited them in Bombay, she was quite taken up with the glitzy world of her sister-in-law. She used to accompany her on many occasions and get-togethers. People would get quite impressed with her looks and offer her a lot of roles. One such offer came from Sashadhar Mukherjee and Devika Rani. Her father consented to her wishes reluctantly, and requested her to never work in Lahore.

Career

Begum Para's first break turned out to be 1944 film Chand, from Prabhat Studios in Poona. Prem Adib was the hero, and Sitara Devi was the vamp in the film. It did extremely well and Para started getting paid about Rs. 1500 a month. Soon after, she and her sister-in-law Protima made a film called Chhamia (1945) based on the novel ‘Pygmalion’, which again was a huge success. Para signed a lot of films after Chhamia, but she couldn’t quite establish herself as an actress. Because she had a highly scandalous image, people always gave her the role of glamour doll in most films. She did not mind this because she always played herself on screen.

She did Sohni Mahiwal (1946) and Zanjeer (1947) with Ishwarlal and Dikshit; Neel Kamal (1947) with Raj Kapoor; Mehendi (1947) with Nargis; Suhaag Raat (1948) with Bharat Bhushan and Geeta Bali; Jhalka (1948); and Meherbani (1950) with Ajit Khan. She also worked in Ustad Pedro (1951), produced and directed by the then well-known actor, Sheikh Mukhtar.  It was a fun film, and was packed with action, romance, and stunts.

In 1951 she posed for photographer James Burke for a Life magazine photo shoot. Para's last role was in the movie Kar Bhala in 1956. She was also offered to play Nigar Sultana’s role 'Bahar' in Mughal-e-Azam (1960). However, she refused to play the role because she considered it against her image.

She made a powerful comeback on the silver screen in Sanjay Leela Bhansali's Saawariya in 2007 as Sonam Kapoor's grandmother (after over 50 years of disappearance in movies and eventually became her final film, before her death the following year, 2008).

Personal life
She married actor Nasir Khan, the younger brother of Bollywood actor Dilip Kumar. They had three children, including the actor Ayub Khan. Begum Para's father Mian Ehsan-ul-Haq of Jalandhar, was a judge who joined the princely state of Bikaner, now northern Rajasthan, where he became chief justice of its highest court. Her husband died in 1974. Following her husband's death, she briefly moved to Pakistan in 1975 to be with her family, two years later she relocated back to India.

Death
She died in her sleep on 9 December 2008 at the age of 82.

Filmography

Saawariya (2007) - Sakina's grandmother
Kar Bala
Kismet Ka Khel (1956)
Pehli Janak (1955)
Shahzada (1955)
Laila Majnu (1953)
Naya Ghar (1953)
Baghdad (1952)
Pagle (1950)
Meharbani (1950)
Jharna (1948)
Shahnaz (1948)
Suhaag Raat (1948) - Paro
Mehandi (1947)
Neel Kamal (1947)
Zanjeer (1947)
The Chain (1947)
Sohni Mahiwal (1946)
Chhamia (1945)
Chand (1944)

References

External links

 

Indian film actresses
1926 births
2008 deaths
Actresses in Hindi cinema
Actresses from Mumbai
Aligarh Muslim University alumni
Indian expatriate actresses in Pakistan
People from Jhelum
20th-century Indian actresses
21st-century Indian actresses
Indian emigrants to Pakistan